Richard Bryan (born 13 September 1995) is an English semi-professional footballer who plays for Ware as a defender.

A product of the Brentford and Enfield Town youth systems, Bryan played lower league football in the United States between 2018 and 2022, most notably for Saint Louis and Detroit City. He returned to England to join non-League club Ware in 2022.

Career

Early years 
Adept across the back, Bryan began his career in the Brentford youth system and signed a scholarship deal ahead of the 2012–13 season. He made 42 appearances and scored three goals during his two-year scholarship, while also making 12 appearances for the Development Squad. Bryan was not offered a professional contract and was released at the end of the 2013–14 season. Following a spell with the U23 team at hometown non-League club Enfield Town, Brian moved to the United States to play college soccer with Lander Bearcats in 2015. During four seasons, Bryan made 75 appearances, scored four goals and served as vice-captain.

United States 
In April 2017, Bryan and Lander Bearcats teammates Jordan Skelton and Sinclaire Sandy joined Premier Developmental League club Mississippi Brilla. He made 34 appearances and scored five goals across the 2017 and 2018 seasons. Following spells with Des Moines Menace and Detroit City respectively in 2019, Bryan turned professional and transferred to USL Championship club Saint Louis in December 2019. He made 13 appearances during the 2020 season, but remained an unused substitute during the club's unsuccessful playoff campaign. Following appearances back in England for non-League club Ware during the 2021–22 pre-season, Bryan returned to Detroit City for the 2021 National Independent Soccer Association fall season, in which he made eight appearances.

Non-League football 
In June 2022, Bryan returned to England to rejoin Southern League First Division Central club Ware on a permanent contract. He made his first senior appearance in English football on the opening day of the season, with a start in a 2–1 win over Thame United.

Personal life 
Bryan attended Lander University.

Career statistics

References

External links
 

1995 births
Living people
Mississippi Brilla players
Des Moines Menace players
Detroit City FC players
Saint Louis FC players
USL League Two players
National Premier Soccer League players
USL Championship players
National Independent Soccer Association players
English footballers
English expatriate footballers
English expatriate sportspeople in the United States
Expatriate soccer players in the United States
Association football defenders
Footballers from Greater London

Ware F.C. players
People from Enfield, London
Association football fullbacks
Southern Football League players